The Toronto Raptors are a Canadian professional basketball team based in Toronto, Ontario. They play in the Atlantic Division of the Eastern Conference in the National Basketball Association (NBA). The Raptors are the only Canadian-based NBA team. The team joined the NBA in 1995 as an expansion team with the Vancouver Grizzlies (which relocated to Memphis, Tennessee in 2001). The Raptors first played their home games at the SkyDome (now known as the Rogers Centre), before moving to Scotiabank Arena (formerly the Air Canada Centre) in 1999, where they have played since. The Raptors are owned by Maple Leaf Sports & Entertainment and Bobby Webster is their general manager.

There have been nine head coaches for the Raptors franchise. The franchise's first head coach was Brendan Malone, who coached for one season. Dwane Casey is the franchise's all-time leader for the most regular-season games coached (397) and the most regular-season game wins (210). Casey is the franchise's all-time leader for the most playoff games coached (51), as well as the most playoff-game wins (21).

Lenny Wilkens is the only Raptors coaches to have been elected into the Basketball Hall of Fame as a coach.

Butch Carter, Kevin O'Neill, and Jay Triano have spent their entire NBA head coaching careers with the Raptors. Triano was the interim head coach of the Raptors since Mitchell was fired. Triano is the first Canadian head coach in NBA history.

Nick Nurse is the only Raptors coach to have won an NBA Championship (2018-19 NBA season) and holds the franchise's highest winning percentage in the regular season (.707) and playoffs (.667). He is currently the Raptors head coach as of the 2022-2023 NBA season.

Key

Coaches

Notes
 A running total of the number of coaches of the Raptors. Thus, any coach who has two or more separate terms as head coach is only counted once.
 Each year is linked to an article about that particular NBA season.

References
General

Specific

Lists of National Basketball Association head coaches by team

head coaches